Gairy St. Clair (born 2 February 1975 in Georgetown, Guyana) is a professional boxer in the junior lightweight (130 lb) division. He is the former IBF world junior-lightweight champion.

He is now based in Australia and is currently trained by Johnny Lewis. After representing Guyana at the 1994 Commonwealth Games, St Clair turned professional in 1994 in his hometown of Georgetown, Guyana.  He went undefeated in 16 bouts with 15 wins and 1 draw before losing a unanimous decision to a then undefeated Diego Corrales.  On 29 July 2006 Gairy challenged Cassius Baloyi for the IBO and IBF super-featherweight titles.  Gairy became world champion winning by a unanimous decision with judges scoring the bout: 116–112 | 115–113 | 115–114.  Gairy however lost the titles in a massive upset to Malcom Klassen a few months later.

On 2 February 2008, he challenged Commonwealth Lightweight champion Amir Khan in the ExCel arena in London, losing after 12 rounds by unanimous points decision 120–108, scored for Khan by all three judges. Although he lost all 12 rounds fought on the scorecard, St Clair managed to hold a steady fight against Khan and kept his composure despite having to deal with Khan's trademark lightning-quick jabs.Superman was Inducted into the Australian National Boxing Hall Of Fame at the Crown Hotel and Casino in Melbourne on the 26th of August 2022.

References

External links 
 

1975 births
Sportspeople from Georgetown, Guyana
Super-featherweight boxers
Living people
World boxing champions
International Boxing Organization champions
International Boxing Federation champions
Guyanese male boxers
Boxers at the 1994 Commonwealth Games
Commonwealth Games competitors for Guyana
Competitors at the 1993 Central American and Caribbean Games
Central American and Caribbean Games bronze medalists for Guyana
Afro-Guyanese people
Central American and Caribbean Games medalists in boxing